The Tecopa Hills are a mountain range of the Mojave Desert in extreme eastern Inyo County, California.

They are east of lower Death Valley and the Amargosa Range, near the Amargosa River and Tecopa, California

References 

Mountain ranges of the Mojave Desert
Amargosa Desert
Mountain ranges of Inyo County, California
Hills of California
Mountain ranges of Southern California